Abingdon Preparatory School (formerly known as Josca's until 2007, and informally known as Abingdon Prep), is an independent preparatory school in the rural setting of Frilford, near Abingdon, Oxfordshire, England.

It is part of the Abingdon Foundation – a collective name for both it, and Abingdon School.  Abingdon Preparatory School caters for boys between 4 and 13.

The School is a leading Preparatory School with the latest report stating 'The pupils’ achievement both inside and outside the classroom was exceptional'. in the inspection undertaken by the Independent Schools Inspectorate (ISI) branch of the Independent Schools Council.

History
The school was founded in 1956 with 5 pupils; it now has around 250 pupils.

In 1998, it merged with Abingdon School, with both schools becoming part of the Abingdon Foundation. In 2007, development costing £3 million – bringing a new sports hall, changing rooms, class rooms, and an art room – was completed. The school has a large sports field – especially large considering the size of the school. The area is known as Cox's Field West and Cox's Field East following a donation from Richard Cox, an Old Abingdonian. In recent years, a bridge over the busy A415 road has been built connecting the school on one side of the road to its sports fields on the other.

Craig Williams, took up the position of Headmaster in September 2017. The head of Abingdon School is Michael Windsor.

References

External links
 Official school website

Preparatory schools in Oxfordshire
Educational institutions established in 1956
1956 establishments in England
Abingdon School